Amílcar Lopes da Costa Cabral (– ) was a Bissau-Guinean and Cape Verdean agricultural engineer, pan-Africanist, intellectual, poet, theoretician, revolutionary, political organizer, nationalist and diplomat. He was one of Africa's foremost anti-colonial leaders.

Also known by the nom de guerre Abel Djassi, Cabral led the nationalist movement of Guinea-Bissau and the Cape Verde Islands and the ensuing war of independence in Guinea-Bissau. He was assassinated on 20 January 1973, about eight months before Guinea-Bissau's unilateral declaration of independence. He was deeply influenced by Marxism, becoming an inspiration to revolutionary socialists and national independence movements worldwide.

Early years

Cabral was born on 12 September 1924. He was born in the town of Bafatá, Portuguese Guinea (located in modern-day Guinea-Bissau) to Cape Verdean parents, Juvenal António Lopes da Costa Cabral and Iva Pinhel Évora, both hailing from Santiago. His father came from a wealthy land-owning family. His mother was a shop owner and hotel worker who worked hard to support her family, especially after she separated from Amílcar's father by 1929. Her family was not well off, so she was unable to pursue higher education.

Amílcar Cabral was educated at Liceu Secondary School Gil Eanes in the town of Mindelo, Cape Verde. He was later educated at the Instituto Superior de Agronomia in Lisbon, Portugal. While an agronomy student in Lisbon, he founded student movements dedicated to opposing the ruling dictatorship of Portugal and promoting the cause of independence for the Portuguese colonies in Africa.

He returned to Africa in the 1950s from Portugal and was instrumental in promoting the independence causes of the then Portuguese colonies. He was also one of the founding members of Movimento Popular Libertação de Angola (MPLA) later in the same year, together with Agostinho Neto, whom he met in Portugal, and other Angolan nationalists. Cabral was an asset of the Czechoslovak State Security (StB), and under the codename "Secretary" provided intelligence information to the StB.

War for independence

From 1963 to his assassination in 1973, Cabral led the PAIGC's guerrilla movement in Portuguese Guinea against the Portuguese government, which evolved into one of the most successful wars of independence in modern African history. The goal of the conflict was to attain independence for both Portuguese Guinea and Cape Verde. Over the course of the conflict, as the movement captured territory from the Portuguese, Cabral became the de facto leader of a large portion of what became Guinea-Bissau.

In preparation for the independence war, Cabral set up training camps in Ghana with the permission of Kwame Nkrumah. Cabral trained his lieutenants through various techniques, including mock conversations to provide them with effective communication skills to aid their efforts in mobilizing Guinean traditional leaders to support the PAIGC. Cabral realized that the war effort could only be sustained if his troops could be fed and taught to live off the land, alongside the larger populace. Being an agronomist, he trained his troops to teach local farmers better farming techniques. This was to ensure that they could increase productivity and be able to feed their own family and community, as well as the soldiers enlisted in the PAIGC's military wing. When not fighting, PAIGC soldiers tilled and ploughed the fields alongside the local population.

Cabral and the PAIGC also set up a trade-and-barter bazaar system that moved around the country and made staple goods available to the countryside at prices lower than that of colonial store owners. During the war, Cabral also set up a roving hospital and triage station to give medical care to wounded PAIGC soldiers and quality-of-life care to the larger populace, relying on medical supplies garnered from the USSR and Sweden. The bazaars and triage stations were at first stationary, until they came under frequent attack from Portuguese regime forces.

Death
In 1972, Cabral began to form a People's Assembly in preparation for the independence of Guinea-Bissau, but disgruntled former PAIGC rival Inocêncio Kani, together with another member of PAIGC, shot and killed him on 20 January 1973 in Conakry. The possible plan was to arrest Cabral (possibly to judge him summarily, later), but facing the peaceful resistance of Cabral, they immediately killed him.

According to some theories, Portuguese PIDE agents, whose alleged plan eventually went awry, wanted to influence Cabral's rivals through agents operating within the PAIGC, in hope of arresting Cabral and placing him under the custody of Portuguese authorities. Another theory claims that Ahmed Sékou Touré, jealous of Cabral's greater international prestige, among other motives, orchestrated the conspiracy; both theories remain unproven and controversial.

After the assassination, about one hundred officers and guerrilla soldiers of the PAIGC, accused of involvement in the conspiracy that resulted in the murder of Amílcar Cabral and the attempt to seize power in the movement, were summarily executed. His half-brother, Luís Cabral, became the leader of the Guinea-Bissau branch of the party and eventually became President of Guinea-Bissau.

Less than a month after the assassination, the United States concluded that then-colonial power Portugal was not directly involved in his death, according to official documents made public in 2006. Even so, the US State Department's Information and Investigation Services also concluded that "Lisbon's complicity" in the assassination of the leader of the struggle for Cape Verde's and Guinea-Bissau's independence "cannot be ruled out."

Later on 25 April 1974, the Carnation Revolution coup was carried out in Portugal, which was followed by a cease-fire in the various battle fronts and eventually by the independence of all of Portugal's former colonies in Africa. Cabral was assassinated prior to the independence of the Portuguese colonies in Africa and therefore died before he could see his homelands of Cabo Verde and Guinea Bissau gain independence from Portugal.

Tributes

Cabral is considered a "revolutionary theoretician as significant as Frantz Fanon and Che Guevara", one "whose influence reverberated far beyond the African continent." Amílcar Cabral International Airport, Cape Verde's principal international airport at Sal, is named in his honor. There is also a football competition, the Amílcar Cabral Cup, in zone 2, named as a tribute to him.
In addition, the only privately owned university in Guinea-Bissau – Amílcar Cabral University, in Bissau – is named after him. Jorge Peixinho composed an elegy to Cabral in 1973.

Author António Tomás wrote a biography of Amílcar Cabral, entitled O Fazedor de Utopias: Uma Biografia de Amílcar Cabral, which offers an extensive overview of Amílcar's life in narrative form. It features a detailed account of Amílcar's family history in Portuguese.

Patrick Chabal professor of Lusophone African studies at King's College, London, also wrote a book about the life and biography of Amílcar Cabral, entitled Amílcar Cabral: Revolutionary Leadership And People's War (1983 and 2003). The book tells the story of Cabral who, as head of PAIGC, Guinea-Bissau's nationalist movement, became one of Africa's foremost revolutionary leaders.

President William R. Tolbert (Republic of Liberia) commissioned and built a housing estate on the Old Road, Sinkor, Monrovia, Liberia, named in honor of Cabral.

There is a block of flats named Amílcar Cabral Court on Porteus Road in west London, situated in the Paddington Green area.

Angolan singer and activist David Zé composed 'Quem Matou Cabral'  in honor of Amílcar Cabral and performed it during the independence celebrations of Mozambique, São Tomé and Príncipe, and Guinea-Bissau.

East Germany issued a postage stamp in his honor in 1978.

A square in Veshnyaki District of Moscow was named "Amílcar Cabral Square" (Russian: «Площадь Амилкара Кабрала» "Ploschad Amilcara Cabrala") since 16 January 1974.

He was voted the second greatest leader in the world in a poll conducted by BBC World History Magazine in March 2020.

In popular culture

Films 
 Cabral's political thought and role in the liberation of Guinea-Bissau and Cape Verde is discussed at some length in Chris Marker's film Sans Soleil (1983). He is also the subject of the Portuguese documentary Amílcar Cabral, which was released in 2000.
 The documentary film Cabralista, winner of the CVIFF (Cape Verde International Film Festival) prize for best documentary in 2011, puts Amilcar Cabral's political views and ideologies in the spotlight.

Music 
The Senegalese band Orchestra Baobab included the song "Cabral", sung in Cape Verdean Creole in their 2007 album Made in Dakar.

Writings
Cabral, Amilcar. Resistance and Decolonization. Translated by Dan Wood. Rowman & Littlefield International, 2016.
Cabral, Amilcar. Return to the Source: Selected Speeches of Amilcar Cabral. Monthly Review Press, 1973.
Cabral, Amilcar. Unity and Struggle: Speeches and Writings of Amilcar Cabral. Monthly Review Press, 1979.

References

Further reading 

Abdel Malek, Karine, "Le processus d'accès à l'indépendance de la Guinée-Bissau.", In : Bulletin de l'Association des Anciens Elèves de l'Institut National de Langues et de Cultures Orientales, N°1, Avril 1998. – pp. 53–60
 
 Chabal, Patrick. Amilcar Cabral: Revolutionary Leadership and People's War. New York and Cambridge, U.K.: Cambridge University Press, 1983. .
 Chailand, Gérard. Armed Struggle in Africa: With the Guerrillas in "Portuguese" Guinea. New York: Monthly Review Press, 1969. .
 
 Dhada, Mustafah. Warriors at Work. Niwot, Colorado, USA: Colorado University Press, 1993.
 
 McCollester, Charles. "The Political Thought of Amilcar Cabral." Monthly Review, 24: 10–21 (March 1973).
 Mendy, Peter Karibe. Amílcar Cabral: A Nationalist and Pan-Africanist Revolutionary. Athens, OH: Ohio University Press, 2019. 
 Sigal, Brad. Amilcar Cabral and the Revolution in Guinea-Bissau, City College of New York.

External links

 "The Weapon of Theory", a speech at the Tricontinental Conference in Havana, 1966.
 Charles Peterson, "Amílcar Lopes Cabral", Encyclopædia Britannica. Updated 8 September 2020.
 "National Liberation and Culture", a speech at Syracuse University in 1970.
 The African Activist Archive Project website has documents, posters, buttons, and photographs related to the struggle for independence in Guinea-Bissau and support for that struggle by U.S. organizations. The website includes photographs of Cabral.
 Works at Marxists.org
 "The Revolution in Guinea-Bissau and the Heritage of Amilcar Cabral" from Africa in Struggle, by Daniel Fogel.
Review of Amilcar Cabral's Unity & Struggle by John Newsinger in International Socialism, 12 (1981). 

1924 births
1973 deaths
African and Black nationalists
African Party for the Independence of Guinea and Cape Verde politicians
African revolutionaries
Assassinated Bissau-Guinean politicians
Bissau-Guinean engineers
Bissau-Guinean Marxists
Bissau-Guinean male writers
Bissau-Guinean military personnel
Bissau-Guinean pan-Africanists
Bissau-Guinean people of Cape Verdean descent
Bissau-Guinean writers
Deaths by firearm in Guinea
National anthem writers
People from Bafatá Region
People murdered in Guinea
Technical University of Lisbon alumni
20th-century engineers